Scarlett is a female name that originated from the color scarlet. It may refer to:

People 
 Scarlett (given name), a feminine name
 Scarlett (surname)
 Scarlett (gamer) (Sasha Hostyn), professional video game player

Fictional characters
 Scarlett (comics)
 Scarlett McCain, a main character in The Outlaws Scarlett and Browne series by Jonathan Stroud

Places
 Scarlett Point, a location on Montagu Island, in the South Sandwich Islands
 Scarlett Point, near Castletown, Isle of Man
 Scarlett Road, a street in Toronto, Ontario, Canada

Arts and entertainment 
 Scarlett (musical), a 1970 musical based on the novel Gone with the Wind
 Scarlett (Cassidy novel), a 2006 novel by Cathy Cassidy
 Scarlett (Ripley novel), a 1991 novel by Alexandra Ripley
 Scarlett (miniseries), a 1994 television adaptation loosely based on the novel Scarlett by Alexandra Ripley
 Scarlett (2006 film), a TV movie starring Rebecca Gayheart directed by Steve Miner
 Scarlett (2018 film), an Italian thriller film directed by Luigi Boccia
 "Scarlett" (song), a 1995 song by Closterkeller off the album Scarlet (Closterkeller album)
 Project Scarlett, working name of the Xbox Series X
 Scarlett Pictures, an Australian film production company

Other uses 
 Scarlett (cat) (1995–2008), a feline who received worldwide media attention for saving her kittens
 Scarlett, a product line of audio USB-interfaces by Focusrite

See also

 
 Scarlet (disambiguation)
 Scarlett Martínez International Airport, international airport serving Río Hato, Mexico